George Oros (born 1954) is an American lawyer and Republican politician from Cortlandt Manor, New York.

Early life and education
Oros was born in Trenton, New Jersey, and moved to White Plains, New York, to attend college. Oros earned a Bachelor of Business Administration from Pace University and a Juris Doctor from the Pace University School of Law.

Career 
Along with practicing law as Assistant Town Attorney of Cortlandt Manor, Oros served for eight years, as the Assistant to the Director of Pace's Michaelian Institute of Suburban Governance. He is currently a partner in the firm of Brotman, Oros & Brusca, in White Plains, New York.

Oros began his career in politics on Cortlandt's Zoning Board of appeals before being elected to the Town Board. In 1995, he ran for an open seat on the County Board of Legislators and he quickly ascended to the board's top position as its Chairman after only 9 months in office. When the Republicans lost their majority in 1999, Oros became the board minority leader. He sits on the Board of Directors of the Hudson Valley Hospital Center, and also served on the Hudson Valley Gateway Chamber of Commerce's Executive Board.

In February 2008, he announced that he was a candidate for Congress against incumbent freshman Democrat John Hall in the traditionally Republican-leaning 19th congressional district. Several candidates entered the race, including Iraq veteran Kieran Lalor, MTA Vice-Chairman Andrew Saul, and former Congressman Joe DioGuardi. On May 22, 2008, Republican delegates from each of the five counties represented in the 19th district met in Mahopac, New York, to choose to endorse Lalor. Oros immediately vowed to stay in the race and mount a primary challenge to Lalor. Oros later suspended his campaign.

Electoral history

See also 
Westchester County, NY

References

External links
George Oros Legislative Website
George Oros for Congress Official Website

1954 births
Living people
New York (state) lawyers
New York (state) Republicans
Pace University alumni
Pace University School of Law alumni
People from Cortlandt Manor, New York
Legislators from Westchester County, New York